Shahzada Huzaifa Mohyuddin was the fourth son of Mohammed Burhanuddin II, the 52nd Dai al-Mutlaq of Dawoodi Bohras, a branch of Tayyabi Mustaali Ismaili Shi'a Islam.

Personal life 
Mohyuddin was born on 1 March 1950 corresponding to 13 Jumada al-Awwal 1369 ھـ to Mohammed Burhanuddin and Aaisaheba Amatullah.

Mohyuddin's mithaq was taken by his grand-father, the 51st Da'i al-Mutlaq, Taher Saifuddin.

Career
Mohyuddin served Alvazaratus Saifiyah which is the office of the Dai al-Mutlaq, and MSB Educational Institute management and leadership with distinction since MSB's inception in 1985 and oversaw its expansion to 23 centers worldwide. Mohyuddin was patron of a number of social, financial and educational institutions of the Dawoodi Bohra community.

Mohyuddin was the special representative of the Dai al-Mutlaq (Mohammed Burhanuddin) for the Dawoodi Bohra jamaats of Pakistan.

Death 

Mohammed Burhanuddin and his successor Mufaddal Saifuddin were presiding over Chehlum festivities at Ahmedabad in 2012 and Mohyuddin was in attendance, where, on 16 January, he suffered a fatal cardiac arrest resulting in his death. He was laid to rest at one of mausoleums at Mazar e Qutbi.

References

Dawoodi Bohras
1950 births
2012 deaths